595 Market Street is a  skyscraper at the corner of Second Street and Market Street in the Financial District of San Francisco, California. It contains 30 floors, and was completed in 1979. The hexagonal-shaped skyscraper was designed by Skidmore, Owings & Merrill.

In 2009, Visa Inc. moved its corporate headquarters to 595 Market Street from San Mateo, before deciding to move to Foster City in October 2012. Current tenants include LendingClub.

See also

 List of tallest buildings in San Francisco

References

External links
 
 595 Market Street on Emporis
 595 Market Street on SkyscraperPage
 595 Market Street on The Skyscraper Center

Skyscraper office buildings in San Francisco
Market Street (San Francisco)
Office buildings completed in 1979
Financial District, San Francisco
Skidmore, Owings & Merrill buildings
Leadership in Energy and Environmental Design gold certified buildings